Ted Grouya (31 July 1910 – 14 April 2000) born Teodor Gruia in Bucharest, Romania, was a composer who studied composition with Nadia Boulanger. He wrote the jazz standard "Flamingo" (1940), first recorded by Herb Jeffries and Duke Ellington. He also co-wrote the song "I Heard You Cried Last Night."

Grouya also wrote the music for the film version of Our Hearts Were Young and Gay (1944) and other films. In 1949 he married American actress Mary Meade.

A one time resident of Palm Springs, California, Grouya had a Golden Palm Star on the Palm Springs Walk of Stars dedicated to him in 1995.

References

External links
Ted Grouya at Jazz Standards

1910 births
2000 deaths
20th-century American composers
Romanian emigrants to the United States